Alain Griset (born 30 May 1953) is a French businessman, politician and former taxi driver who briefly served as Minister Delegate in charge of Small and Medium-Sized Entreprises attached to the Ministry of the Economy, Finance and Recovery in the government of Prime Minister Jean Castex from 2020 to 2021. On 8 December 2021 Griset announced his resignation from the government after being found guilty of underpayment of taxes.

Early life and career
Alain Griset was born on 30 May 1953 in a working-class family in Faches-Thumesnil, Northern France. His father was a metal worker and his mother a stay-at-home mom. At 19 he started working as a switchboard operator in a taxi company after failing his Baccalauréat in mechanical manufacturing, he passed the taxi exam at 21 and started working as a driver. In 1975 he created his own taxi company in Lille; he then settled in Maubeuge then Tourcoing and finally Douai.

In 1989, Griset was elected to the Chamber of Trades and Crafts of Northern France in 1995, he became its president. In 2005 the body changed to Chamber of Trades and Crafts  of the Nord-Pas-de-Calais region and he became its president.

Political career
On July 6, 2020, after the appointment of Jean Castex as Prime Minister, Griset was appointed Minister Delegate in charge of Small and Medium-Sized Entreprises, attached to the Minister of the Economy, Bruno Le Maire. After being found guilty of underpayment of taxes, Griset announced his resignation from the government on 8 December 2021 .

See also
 Castex Government

References

Sources

External links
 Alain Griset on French Government website
 Alain Griset on Ministry of Economy website

1953 births
Living people
French politicians
French taxi drivers